See also Campbell Settlement, Kings County
 Campbell Settlement is a settlement in  Carleton County, New Brunswick on Route 555.

History

Notable people

See also
List of communities in New Brunswick

References

Settlements in New Brunswick
Communities in York County, New Brunswick